Gaia BH2 (Gaia DR3 5870569352746779008) is a binary system consisting of a red giant and what is very likely a stellar-mass black hole. Gaia BH2 is located about 3,800 light years away ( away) in the constellation of Centaurus, making it currently the third closest known black hole system to Earth. Gaia BH2 is the second black hole discovered from Gaia DR3 astrometric data, and Gaia BH1 and BH2 are likely the only black hole binaries which will be detected from Gaia DR3 data.

The black hole and red giant orbit the system barycentre every 1,276 days, or around 3.5 years, with a moderate eccentricity of 0.518.

Discovery 
Gaia BH2 was originally discovered as a black hole binary candidate in 2022, found via astrometric observations with Gaia, along with Gaia BH1. At that time it was not clear if Gaia BH2 did definitely harbour a black hole, but it was the only plausible candidate in the Gaia data other than Gaia BH1. Later RV observations confirmed this black hole system and refined its orbital parameters.

References 

Centaurus (constellation)
Red giants
Stellar black holes
Astrometric binaries
20230215